Agrapidokampos is a settlement forming part of the community of Makyneia in Aetolia-Acarnania, Greece. At the 2011 census, it had 7 inhabitants. 
The village is located 5 km north of Makyneia, 8 km northwest of Antirrio and 10 km west of Nafpaktos.

History
The name of the village literally means the "field of wild pears". Ancient ruins have been preserved on the ridge between Agrapidokampos and Velvina, in the area named Elliniko. Agrapidokampos was a village of the earlier municipality of Nafpaktos until 1912, when it became part of the community of Riza (Makyneia). In 1989, Agrapidokampos became part of the municipality of Antirrio which is a municipal unit of Nafpaktia since 2011.

Historical population

References

External links
Velvina-Ancient town of Velvina (Ellinika)-Agrapidokampos - Ancient Theatre of Makyneia 

Populated places in Aetolia-Acarnania
Nafpaktia